MONIAC or Moniac may refer to:

 MONIAC, a hydraulic economics computer
 Moniac, Georgia, an unincorporated community
 David Moniac (1802–1836), an American military officer
 a fan of softball player Monica Abbott

See also

 Moniak (disambiguation)
 Moniack (disambiguation)
 Monyak Hill, Antarctica
 Monjack